The 1948–49 Chicago Black Hawks season was the team's 23rd season in the National Hockey League. The Black Hawks finished fifth and did not qualify for the playoffs.

Regular season
The Black Hawks were coming off a last-place finish in the 1947–48 season, failing to qualify for post-season play for the second straight year. The Black Hawks would get off to a bad start, losing their first four games, before making a trade with the Detroit Red Wings. The Hawks sent Bud Poile and Hully Gee to Detroit in exchange for Jim Conacher, Doug McCaig, and Bep Guidolin. The trade would initially pay off, as the Black Hawks would post a 14–9–2 record in the next 25 games. However, they slumped again, winning only seven of their remaining 21 games and missing the playoffs for the third straight season, finishing in fifth place, seven points behind the Toronto Maple Leafs for the final playoff spot.

Offensively, the Hawks were led by Roy Conacher, who would win the Art Ross Trophy as he led the NHL with 68 points, scoring a team high 26 goals. Doug Bentley would finish just behind Conacher, with 66 points, including an NHL high 43 assists. Jim Conacher played a solid season, earning 48 points in 55 games. Defenseman Ralph Nattrass led the Hawks' blue line with 14 points, while Bep Guidolin had a team high 116 penalty minutes.

In goal, Jim Henry, who the Hawks acquired from the New York Rangers in exchange for Emile Francis and Alex Kaleta in the off-season, received all the action, winning 21 games and posting a GAA of 3.52.

Season standings

Record vs. opponents

Schedule and results

Regular season

Awards and records
 Roy Conacher – Art Ross Trophy, First Team All-Star
 Doug Bentley – Second Team All-Star

Player statistics

Scoring leaders

Goaltending

References
 SHRP Sports
 The Internet Hockey Database
 National Hockey League Guide & Record Book 2007

Notes

Chicago Blackhawks seasons
Chicago
Chicago